Arrimal is a former civil parish in the municipality of Porto de Mós, Portugal. The population in 2011 was 774, in an area of 18.57 km2. On 28 January 2013 it merged with Mendiga to form Arrimal e Mendiga.

References 

Former parishes of Porto de Mós